"Blue Train" is a song written by William H. Smith. Originally recorded by Johnny Cash for Sun in May 1958, it wasn't released until 1962, when Cash's long-time former label chose it for a single release.

The song has been covered by a number of artists including Marty Stuart.

References 

1962 songs
Sun Records singles
Johnny Cash songs